Hereford is an unincorporated community in northwest Callaway County, in the U.S. state of Missouri. The community is on Missouri Route DD 2.5 miles north of I-70.

History
A post office called Hereford was established in 1898, and remained in operation until 1907. The community was named after the Hereford cattle near the site.

References

Unincorporated communities in Callaway County, Missouri
Unincorporated communities in Missouri
Jefferson City metropolitan area